The Finlay Baronetcy, of Epping in the County of Essex, is a title in the Baronetage of the United Kingdom. It was created on 31 December 1964 for the Conservative politician Graeme Finlay. He had previously represented Epping in the House of Commons. As of 2021 the title is held by his grandson, the third baronet, who succeeded in that year.

Finlay baronets, of Epping (1964)
Sir Graeme Bell Finlay, 1st Baronet (1917–1987)
Sir David Ronald James Bell Finlay, 2nd Baronet (1963–2021)
Sir Tristan James Bell Finlay, 3rd baronet (born 2001).

There is no heir.

Notes

References
Kidd, Charles, Williamson, David (editors). Debrett's Peerage and Baronetage (1990 edition). New York: St Martin's Press, 1990, 

Finlay
1964 establishments in the United Kingdom